Menetia is a genus of skinks, lizards in the family Scincidae. The member species of the genus Menetia are endemic to Australia. They are ground-dwellers and live in open forests and open grasslands.

Species
The following six species are recognized as being valid.

Menetia alanae  – Alana's menetia, Top End dwarf skink
Menetia amaura  – common dwarf skink
Menetia concinna  – Jabiluka dwarf skink
Menetia greyii  – common dwarf skink, Grey's menetia
Menetia maini  – Main's menetia, northern dwarf skink
Menetia surda  – western dwarf skink

References

Further reading
Cogger HG (2014). Reptiles and Amphibians of Australia, Seventh Edition. Clayton, Victoria, Australia: CSIRO Publishing. xxx + 1,033 pp. .
Gray JE (1845). Catalogue of the Specimens of Lizards in the Collection of the British Museum. London: Trustees of the British Museum. (Edward Newman, printer). xxviii + 289 pp. (Menetia, new genus, p. 65).
Wilson, Steve; Swan, Gerry (2013). A Complete Guide to Reptiles of Australia, Fourth Edition. Sydney: New Holland Publishers. 522 pp. .

 
Skinks of Australia
Lizard genera
Taxa named by John Edward Gray